HMS Terrapin was a British submarine of the third group of the T class. She was built as P323 by Vickers Armstrong, Barrow  and launched on 31 August 1943.  So far she has been the only ship of the Royal Navy to bear the name Terrapin, after the animal of that name. Apart from a brief period in home waters off the Scandinavian coast, Terrapin served in the Far East for much of her wartime career.

Service

Though only commissioned on 22 January 1944, she had a comparatively active career. In March 1944 she attacked a German convoy off Flekkefjord, Norway, torpedoing and damaging the German catapult ship , and the German tanker Wörth (the former Dutch Omala). The Schwabenland was grounded at Sildeneset in Abelnes harbour to prevent her from sinking and the Wörth was towed to port.

Terrapin was then assigned to the Pacific Far East in mid 1944. She opened her career by bombarding Japanese installations at Gunung Sitoli (Nias Island), western Sumatra. She also sank a Japanese coaster with gunfire and damaged another.  She went on to sink the Japanese auxiliary netlayer Kumano Maru, the Japanese minesweeper W 5, and ten Japanese sailing vessels, damaging another.

Terrapin often operated with HMS Trenchant, and together they sank the Japanese tanker Yaei Maru No.6, the Japanese auxiliary minesweeper Reisui Maru, the Japanese submarine chaser Ch 8, a fishing vessel and seven coasters. Terrapin herself sank another small craft with gunfire.

Terrapin was damaged on 19 May 1945 by depth charges from Japanese escort vessels while attacking an escorted tanker. With the assistance of the American submarine USS Cavalla, she was escorted and returned to Fremantle, Australia. After inspection Terrapin was declared a constructive total loss on return to harbour and was later scrapped in June 1946.

References

 
 

 

British T-class submarines of the Royal Navy
Ships built in Barrow-in-Furness
1943 ships
World War II submarines of the United Kingdom
Lost submarines of the United Kingdom
Cold War submarines of the United Kingdom
Maritime incidents in May 1945